WEKS (92.5 FM; "The Bear 92.5") is a radio station broadcasting a country music format.  Licensed to Zebulon, Georgia, with studios in downtown Fayetteville, Georgia, United States.  The station is currently owned by the Georgia Radio Alliance, LLC., which is headed by Christopher Murray. The Georgia Radio Alliance also owns the Classic Hits formatted "Fox FM" stations WMDG, WFDR, and WBAF. WEKS features live and local country music programming, custom designed for the Southside of Atlanta, Georgia.

WEKS currently features an all locally programmed country music format branded as "The Bear 92.5." The station is currently programmed by Robbie Ashley, who also hosts the station morning show alongside Cal Cross. Other personalities on WEKS include former WGST program director, and WCOH operations manager, and morning show co-host Chris East, who currently hosts middays and serves as operations manager for WEKS/WFDR, Cadillac Jack (formerly of WKHX-FM) hosts Afternoons on WEKS, former WTGA-FM on-air personality Dustin Fordham hosts evenings on WEKS using the name 'D-Rock,' and Atlanta radio veteran Steve Mitchell (who also serves as Creative Services Director) hosts weekend shifts on WEKS. The station also airs nationally syndicated programming like the Dee Jay Silver & The Country Club mixshow Friday nights, The Original Country Gold with Rowdy Yates show Saturday nights, and Honky Tonkin’ with Tracy Lawrence Sunday nights. WEKS also has a Gospel show that airs Sunday mornings that is hosted by Robbie Ashley.

WEKS is licensed to broadcast in HD Radio. In September of 2021, WEKS acquired the equipment needed to transmit an HD signal and is in the process of getting the equipment installed. It has also been said that WEKS-HD2 will more than likely be a simulcast of Classic Hits sister station "Fox FM."

WEKS uses PlayoutOne for its automation system, a Wheatstone Audioarts AIR-4 12 Channel Mixer, an Orban Optimod 8400 for audio processing, and a GatesAir 20kW transmitter with 2 ERI bays.

History
WEKS went on the air in or around 1995 licensed to Zebulon. Owned by Legacy Media, LLC. and branded as "92.5 FM The Bear," (a nod to the Griffin High School mascot, the grizzly bear) the then satellite-fed Country music formatted radio station served Griffin and the immediate surrounding areas with 6kW from a tower south of Griffin in the town of Zebulon. Original studios for WEKS were also located in Griffin.

In 2006, WEKS upgraded to 25kW from a new tower located near the town of Gay. This upgrade gave WEKS better coverage to the cities of Fayetteville, and Newnan, as well as giving WEKS fringe coverage into the southern portion of Atlanta. Around this time, the station moved its studios into downtown Senoia.

In the early 2010s, WEKS dropped Jones Radio Networks' satellite-fed Country music programming and the station moved to local programming.

In 2017, Christopher Murray bought Legacy Media, LLC. After this, WEKS saw a major overhaul in programming. The station began strictly centering its music towards new country, rather than a mix of classic and new country; a slogan change from "The Best Of Today's Country, Plus The Legends" to "The Southside's Best Country" reflected this change, as well as a slight rebrand from "92.5 The Bear" to "The Bear 92.5." Around this time, the station studios were moved once again, this time to Downtown Fayetteville.

In November of 2021, Atlanta radio veteran Cadillac Jack joined WEKS to host the stations' afternoon drive slot. Cadillac Jack worked at various different radio stations in Atlanta before his 22-year stint at WKHX as the stations' morning show host.

On-Air Lineup
Monday - Thursday

- Mornings (6:00 to 10:00am): The Half & Half Morning Show With Robbie & Cal
- Middays (10:00am to 3:00pm): Chris East
- Afternoons (3:00 to 7:00pm): William 'Cadillac Jack' Choate
- Evenings (7:00pm to 12:00am): Dustin 'D-Rock' Fordham

Friday

- Mornings (6:00 to 10:00am): The Half & Half Morning Show With Robbie & Cal
- Middays (10:00am to 3:00pm): Chris East
- Afternoons (3:00 to 7:00pm): William 'Cadillac Jack' Choate
- Evenings (7:00pm to 12:00am): Dee-Jay Silver & The Country Club

Saturday

- Middays (10:00am to 3:00pm): Steve Mitchell
- Evenings (7:00pm to 12:00am): The Original Country Gold with Rowdy Yates

Sunday

- Mornings (7:00 to 10:00am): Heavenly Sunday Morning with Robbie Ashley
- Middays (10:00am to 3:00pm): Steve Mitchell
- Evenings: Locals, Legends And Some That Will Be With D-Rock (7:00 to 9:00pm) / Honky Tonkin' With Tracy Lawrence (9:00pm to 12:00am)

References

External links

EKS
Radio stations established in 1990